Fiane is a village in Tvedestrand municipality in Agder county, Norway. The village is located at the intersection of the European route E18 highway and the Norwegian County Road 415. The historic  Holt Church lies just south of Fiane, and this was the administrative centre of the old municipality of Holt which existed from 1838 until 1960.

References

Villages in Agder
Tvedestrand